Son Won-il (born August 10, 1962) is a South Korean voice actor who joined the Munhwa Broadcasting Corporation's Voice Acting Division in 1985.

Roles

Broadcasting TV
24 (replacing Thomas Kretschmann by Season 2, Korea TV Edition, MBC)
CSI: Crime Scene Investigation (replacing Alex Carter, Korea TV Edition, MBC)
Cardcaptor Sakura (Korea TV Edition, SBS)
Naruto (Korea TV Edition, Tooniverse) - Kakashi Hatake

External links
Daum Cafe Voice Actor Son Won-il Blog (in Korean)
MBC Voice Acting Division Son Won-il Blog (in Korean)
Ad Sound Son Won-il Blog (in Korean)

Living people
South Korean male voice actors
1982 births